This page lists board and card games, wargames, miniatures games, and tabletop role-playing games published in 2006.  For video games, see 2006 in video gaming.

Games released or invented in 2006

Game awards given in 2006
Spiel des Jahres: Thurn and Taxis
 Games: Vegas Showdown
 Imperial won the Spiel Portugal Jogo do Ano.

Deaths

See also
2006 in video gaming

References

Games
Games by year